Conor Young (born 15 August 1995) is an Australian-born Canadian rugby union player, currently playing for the . His preferred position is prop.

Early career
Young is from Yamba, New South Wales and has represented the Southern Districts since 2014. Between 2019 and 2022, he represented Southern Knights in Scotland's Super 6 competition.

Professional career
He signed for the New England Free Jacks ahead of the 2023 Major League Rugby season.

Young is Canadian qualified, and represented Canada U20 in 2015. He made his debut for the full Canada side against Netherlands in late 2022.

References

External links
itsrugby.co.uk Profile

1995 births
Living people
Australian rugby union players
Canadian rugby union players
Canada international rugby union players
Rugby union props
Greater Sydney Rams players
New England Free Jacks players